Zack Davisson is a writer, lecturer, and translator, especially known for translating the works of Shigeru Mizuki, Leiji Matsumoto, Go Nagai, Satoshi Kon, and Gou Tanabe. He is also well known for his works on Japanese folklore and ghosts.

In 2015, Davisson wrote his first book, Yurei: The Japanese Ghost. Davisson went on to translate the works of Mizuki Shigeru, a popular Japanese manga artist and historian, into English. Davisson has cited Japanese writer Lafcadio Hearn as an inspiration on his work.

Personal life
Davisson was born in Anaheim, California, but grew up in Spokane, Washington, where he attended University High School. He moved to Seattle where he attended Cornish College of the Arts. He moved to Japan on the JET Programme from 2001–2008 and did an MA in Japanese Studies from the University of Sheffield. He married his wife, Miyuki, in Osaka. Currently, he lives in Seattle, Washington.

Career
Davisson started his career writing for Japanese magazines like Japanzine and Kansai Time-Out. His first professional translation was Mizuki's manga series Showa: A History of Japan. He ran a website, hyakumonogatari.com, where he published translated works on manga and Japanese horror legends. He has translated several manga series into English and has written for Smithsonian (magazine) and The Comics Journal. He co-scripts Demon Days from Marvel comics with Peach Momoko.

He has lectured on manga, folklore, and translation at colleges such as Duke University, Annapolis Naval Academy, University Ca' Foscaria Venizia, UCLA, and the University of Washington and contributed to exhibitions at the Henry Art Gallery, the Museum of International Folkart, Wereldmuseum Rotterdan, and the Art Gallery of New South Wales.

Selected works

Writing
 Yurei: The Japanese Ghost – Chin Music Press, 2014
 Kaibyo: The Supernatural Cats of Japan – Chin Music Press, 2017
 Yokai Stories – Chin Music Press, 2017
 The Art of Star Wars Visions – Dark Horse Comics, 2022
 Demon Days – Marvel Comics, 2023

Translations
 Showa: A History of Japan – Drawn and Quarterly, 2013
 Opus (manga) – Dark Horse, 2014
 Shigeru Mizuki's Hitler – Drawn and Quarterly, 2014
 Panty & Stocking with Garterbelt – Dark Horse Comics, 2015
 Queen Emeraldas – Kodansha, 2016
 Gegege no Kitaro – Drawn and Quarterly, 2016
 The Black Museum (manga) – Kodansha, 2016
 Captain Harlock: Dimensional Voyage – Seven Seas, 2017
 Captain Harlock – Seven Seas, 2018
 Devilman – Seven Seas, 2018
 Cutie Honey – Seven Seas, 2018
 Space Battleship Yamato – Seven Seas, 2019
 Star Blazers: Space Battleship Yamato 2199 – Dark Horse Comics, 2019
 Cat + Gamer – Dark Horse Comics, 2022

References

American writers
American comics writers
1972 births
Living people
Collectors of fairy tales
Ghost story writers
Marvel Comics writers
Japanese folklorists
Japanologists
21st-century American translators
Japanese–English translators